Astroblepus rosei is a species of catfish of the family Astroblepidae. It can be found on Cajamarca, Peru.

Named in honor of botanist Joseph Nelson Rose (1862-1928), United States National Museum

References

Bibliography
Eschmeyer, William N., ed. 1998. Catalog of Fishes. Special Publication of the Center for Biodiversity Research and Information, num. 1, vol. 1–3. California Academy of Sciences. San Francisco, California, United States. 2905. .

Astroblepus
Taxa named by Carl H. Eigenmann
Fish described in 1922
Freshwater fish of Peru